WAtoday is an online newspaper, focusing its coverage on Perth and Western Australia. It was established on 10 June 2008, and is owned by Fairfax Digital (now Nine Publishing, under Nine Entertainment Co).

The company employs ten journalists in Perth. It is based in the same building as radio station 6PR, at 169 Hay Street, East Perth.

It is in competition with the online services provided by The West Australian and PerthNow, both owned by Seven West Media.

See also 
 Northern Territory News
 Perth Now

References

External links
WAtoday website

Internet properties established in 2008
Australian news websites
Fairfax Media
2008 establishments in Australia
Newspapers published in Perth, Western Australia